Sean Taylor is a British author of children's books. He was born in 1965 and grew up in Surrey, England, he taught in Zimbabwe before studying at Cambridge. He currently divides his time between the United Kingdom and Brazil, where his wife is from.

Career
Taylor has written more than 50 children's books. His best known picture books include Hoot Owl, Master of Disguise (illustrated by Jean Jullien), When a Monster is Born (illustrated by Nick Sharratt), A Brave Bear (illustrated by Emily Hughes), and Huck Runs Amuck! (illustrated by Peter H. Reynolds). He's co-authored three illustrated nature books with ecologist Alex Morss: Winter Sleep, Busy Spring and Funny Bums, Freaky Beaks. He's also written longer fiction, including A Waste of Good Paper - a novel for teenagers set in a Pupil Referral Unit , and a number of first reading books including the Purple Class series.

Aside from writing, Sean Taylor has taught on three continents and runs poetry workshops in schools. He's based in Bristol with his wife and their two sons.

Awards
In December 2007, his book When a Monster is Born, illustrated by Nick Sharratt, won a gold medal in the Nestlé Prize for works for children five years old and under. However, he turned down the prize money from the sponsor, Nestlé, because of "questions surrounding Nestlé’s marketing of breast-milk substitutes".

In January 2008, Nestlé withdrew from the 23-year-old sponsorship role of the Booktrust administrated prize for children's writing.

In August 2007 the Dutch edition of When a Monster is Born (Als er een monster is geboren) was awarded with a Pluim van de maand (Feather of the month).

Robot Rumpus, illustrated by Ross Collins, won the Scottish Book Trust Children's Book Awards in 2015.

Hoot Owl, Master of Disguise has been recognised by a number of awards, winning the 2017 Hampshire Picture Book Award and the 2018 Hong Kong Golden Dragon Book Award, and becoming a Honor Book in the 2016 Charlotte Zolotow Award.

In 2017 Where the Bugaboo Lives, an interactive choose your own adventure story illustrated by Neal Layton, won the Hampshire Illustrated Book Award and the Coventry Inspiration Book Award. It is now a Little Angel Theatre production.

Works 

Boing! (illustrated by Bruce Ingman) Candlewick Press 2004
Purple Class and the Skelington (illustrated by Helen Bate) Frances Lincoln Children's Books 2006
Purple Class and the Flying Spider (illustrated by Helen Bate) Frances Lincoln Children's Books 2006
The Great Snake: Stories from the Amazon (illustrated by Fernando Vilela) Frances Lincoln Children's Books 2008
The Bopping Big Band (illustrated by Christyan Fox) Scholastic 2008
When a Monster is Born (illustrated by Nick Sharratt) Roaring Brook Press, Macmillan Publishers 2009
Crocodiles are the Best Animals of All! (illustrated by Hannah Shaw) Frances Lincoln Children's Books 2009
Purple Class and the Half-Eaten Sweater (illustrated by Helen Bate) Frances Lincoln Children's Books 2009
Tickling Tigers (illustrated by Jo Brown) Orchard 2010
The Ring Went Zing! (illustrated by Jill Barton) Dial Press 2010
Huck Runs Amuck! (illustrated by Peter H. Reynolds) Dial Press 2011
The Grizzly Bear with the Frizzly Hair (illustrated by Hannah Shaw) Frances Lincoln Children's Books 2011
The World Champion of Staying Awake (illustrated by Jimmy Liao) Walker Books 2011
A Waste of Good Paper, Frances Lincoln Children's Books 2012
Who Ate Auntie Iris? (illustrated by Hannah Shaw) Frances Lincoln Children's Books 2012
Robomop (illustrated by Edel Rodriguez) Dial Press 2013
Robot Rumpus (illustrated by Ross Collins) Andersen Press 2013
We Have Lift-Off! (illustrated by Hannah Shaw)  Frances Lincoln Children's Books 2013
Fiddlesticks! (illustrated by Sally Garland) Simon & Schuster 2014
That's What Makes a Hippopotamus Smile (illustrated by Laurent Cardon) Frances Lincoln Children's Books 2014
Goal! (illustrated by Caio Vilela) Henry Holt and Company 2014
Where the Bugaboo Lives (illustrated by Neal Layton) Walker Books 2015
It's a Groovy World, Alfredo! (illustrated by Chris Garbutt) Walker Books 2015 
What A Naughty Bird (illustrated by Dan Widdowson) Templar Publishing 2015
The World-Famous Cheese Shop Break-in (illustrated by Hannah Shaw) Frances Lincoln Children's Books 2015
Hoot Owl, Master of Disguise (illustrated by Jean Jullien) Walker Books 2016
A Brave Bear (illustrated by Emily Hughes) Walker Books 2016
Don't Call Me Choochie Pooh! (illustrated by Kate Hindley) Walker Books 2016
I Want to Be in a Scary Story (illustrated by Jean Jullien) Walker Books 2017
The Snowbear (illustrated by Claire Alexander) The Quarto Group 2017
They Came From Planet Zabalooloo! (illustrated by Kate Hindley) Walker Books 2017
I Am Actually a Penguin (illustrated by Kasia Matyjaszek) Templar 2018
Riding a Donkey Backwards: Wise and Foolish Tales of Mulla Nasruddin (illustrated by Shirin Adl) co-author Khayaal Theatre, Otter-Barry Books, 2018
Winter Sleep: A Hibernation Story (illustrated by Cinyee Chiu) Quarto Group 2019
Kiss the Crocodile (illustrated by Ben Mantle) Walker Books 2019
My Mum Always Looks After Me So Much (illustrated by David Barrow) Frances Lincoln Children's Books 2019
Humperdink Our Elephant Friend (illustrated by Claire Alexander) Quarto Group 2019
Good Dog! (illustrated by David Barrow) Frances Lincoln Children's Books 2020
Busy Spring: Nature Wakes Up co-written by Alex Morss (illustrated by Cinyee Chiu) Quarto Group 2021
Funny Bums, Freaky Beaks co-written by Alex Morss (illustrated by Sarah Edmonds) Welbeck Publishing Group 2021
How to Be Cooler Than Cool (illustrated by Jean Jullien) Walker Books 2021

References 

Living people
English children's writers
Year of birth missing (living people)